Elophila ealensis is a moth in the family Crambidae. It was described by David John Lawrence Agassiz in 2012. It is found in the Democratic Republic of the Congo.

The wingspan is about 14 mm. The forewings are white with fuscous markings. The hindwings are white basally, with a dark fuscous median fascia, edged with white, as well as a fuscous band before the whitish termen.

Etymology
The species name refers to Eala (in Tshuapa Province), the type locality.

References

Acentropinae
Moths described in 2012
Moths of Africa